Veprichlamys is a genus of scallops in the family Pectinidae. This genus contains 8 extant species and one extinct species (V. leprosa from the Miocene of Australia).

Species 

 Veprichlamys africana Dijkstra & Kilburn, 2001
 Veprichlamys challengeri (E. A. Smith, 1891)
 Veprichlamys deynzerorum Dijkstra, 2004
 Veprichlamys incantata (Hertlein, 1972)
 Veprichlamys jousseaumei (Bavay, 1904)
 Veprichlamys kiwaensis (Powell, 1933)
 †Veprichlamys leprosa Beu and Darragh 2001
 Veprichlamys perillustris (Iredale, 1925)
 Veprichlamys versipellis Dijkstra & Kastoro, 1997

References 

Bivalve genera
Pectinidae